The Discovery Bay Tunnel is a toll tunnel that links Discovery Bay Road at Yi Pak Au to Cheung Tung Road at Siu Ho Wan beside the North Lantau Highway. It was built for the Discovery Bay residential development on the north-eastern coast of Lantau Island, Hong Kong.

It is open 24 hours everyday to vehicles approved by the Transport Department; including residents' coaches, goods vehicles for goods delivery and servicing functions, and Hong Kong Government vehicles are allowed to use the tunnel. The toll charge ranges between HK$ 50.00 to 250.00 depending on the type of vehicle.

As the development is car-free, private vehicles are discouraged from entering. Private cars or private delivery vans can only enter with special permits issued in advance, between the hours of 09:00 and 18:00 every day.

The tunnel is managed by HKR International Limited.

External links
The tunnel website on HKR

Road tunnels in Hong Kong
Discovery Bay
Tunnels completed in 2000